Mimí Bechelani was a Mexican actress, writer and screenwriter. She had spent her entire career writing for Televisa. Bechelani was also a radio announcer, as well as a writer of poetry, novels, dramas, films, and theater scripts, for radio, TV, theatre and film industry.

Biography and life
Mimí Bechelani de la Peña was born in Mexico City, Mexico, on September 5, 1917. Since she was a little girl she had a big imagination, was an avid reader and started to write since she was on elementary school. As a child, her father died, but she received a good education. Bechelani studied painting, English, French, history and theater. She accompanied Amparo Villegas to New York to dub English films in Spanish, after being discovered by Luis de Llano Palmer and being hired by Metro-Goldwyn-Mayer on the 1940s. There, she also worked as a theater actress. In 1952, she worked at Radio Femenina. She also worked at successful radio station XEW, as a writer and radio announcer. To survive, Bechelani worked as a high school teacher. She married a doctor, Mario Hernández, but they had no children. Their marriage lasted until he died.

Bechelani has written extensively, creating more than 200 works for radio and television. She is best known for being the author of the 1959 telenovela, Teresa.  It was made into a film in 1961 (starring Maricruz Olivier) and was remade into four telenovelas, three with that title.

Mimí Bechelani died on November 8, 1992.

Selected television works

Original stories

Adaptations 
 Mi rival (1973) (original by Inés Rodena)
 Los que ayudan a Dios (1973) (original by Nené Cascallar)
 Mi primer amor (1973) (original by Walter Negrão)

Remakes written herself 
 El honorable Señor Valdez (1973) (remake of El profesor Valdez)
 El cuarto mandamiento (1967) (remake of Teresa)

Remakes written by others 
 Teresa (2010) (remake of Teresa) by Ximena Suárez 
 Madres egoístas (1991) (remake of Madres egoístas) by Josefina Palos y Romo
 Teresa (1989) (remake of Teresa) by Silvia Castillejos and Francisco Sánchez
 Teresa (1969) (Brazilian remake of Teresa) by Raimundo Lopez.

Poetry
 (1970) Fuego al sol; poemas eróticos

References

External links
 

Women soap opera writers
Telenovela writers
20th-century Mexican women writers
20th-century Mexican writers
Mexican women poets
1992 deaths
1917 births